Danish Sait (born 1 July 1988) is an Indian stand-up comedian, television host, radio jockey, actor, and writer who works in Kannada cinema.

Career 
Danish Sait worked as a radio jockey for Supari on Fever 104 FM in 2013. On the channel, he made several prank calls and enacted an array of fictional roles including Asgar, Chacko, Nagesh and Nagraj. He is also a stand-up comedian and is a part of the Bengaluru-based comedy group The Improv. Starting in 2014, he hosted several sports shows including Pro Kabaddi League and the Cricket World Cup in 2015 before hosting  Neevu Bhale Khiladi, a reality television show on Star Suvarna. He made his film debut with the Kannada movie Humble Politician Nograj in 2018 and portrayed the titular character in the film in addition to co-writing the film with director Saad Khan. The film released to positive reviews with one critic stating that "Danish Sait never fails to draw the audience, irrespective of where and how he plans to entertain. What is appealing is that he remains true to the character of Nograj ". In 2020, he starred in the Hindi-language web series Afsos as a tourist in Mumbai. That same year, he starred in the comedy French Biriyani as an auto driver along with Sal Yusuf, whom he worked with in The Improv. In the film, he reprised the role of Asgar from his prank calls. He is set to star in 777 Charlie alongside Rakshit Shetty.

He has worked with the Bengaluru based team Royal Challengers Bangalore in the Indian Premier League as an anchor and mascot for the team, he also plays as Mr. Nags on the RCB Insider Show.

Personal life 
His sister Kubbra Sait is an actress while his uncle Tanveer Sait is a politician. His grandfather, Azeez Sait, was a minister in Karnataka. He married Anya Rangaswamy, a graphic designer.

Filmography 

All films are in Kannada, unless otherwise noted.

Films

Television

Awards and nominations

References

External links 

Living people
Indian stand-up comedians
Male actors in Kannada cinema
Indian male film actors
Indian male television actors
Indian television presenters
Indian radio presenters
1987 births